Leon Jacob Cole (June 1, 1877 – February 17, 1948) was an American geneticist and ornithologist.

Biography

Early life and family
Cole was born on June 1, 1877, in Allegany, New York. He received his education at Michigan Agricultural College and later at the University of Michigan, from which he graduated in 1901. In 1906, Cole received his PhD from Harvard University.  In that same year, he married Margaret Belcher Goodenow; the couple had a daughter and a son.

Breeding and genetics
During the period from 1906 to 1910 he was in charge of the Division of Animal Breeding and Pathology at the Rhode Island Experiment Station, as well as an instructor in zoology at Yale University.

He joined the University of Wisconsin in 1910, to initiate the Department of Experimental Breeding, a forerunner of the university's Department of Genetics. He was made a professor in 1914, and held the title of Professor of Genetics from 1918 to 1947.

Cole's contributions to genetics covered a wide scope of interests, and he collaborated with a diverse group of researchers from various university departments who studied a range of plants and animals. His department's research explored the genetic improvement of corn and other food crops, poultry, dairy cattle, other livestock, bees, and fur animals. Among birds, Cole and his students focused on the genetics and hybridization of Columbidae, particularly domestic pigeons and ring doves. Along with papers considering plumage color, the team published work on the genetics of the birds' immunology, fertility, and physical defects.

In 1923, at the request of Secretary Henry Wallace, Cole took a one-year leave of absence to work for the Department of Agriculture, serving as Chief of the Husbandry Division in the Bureau of Animal Husbandry.  In 1926–1927, he was elected chairman of the Division on Biology and Agriculture of the National Research Council.  He also served as president of the Wisconsin Academy of Arts and Sciences (1924–1927) and of the Genetics Society of America in 1940.

In the 1920s, Margaret Sanger and the Birth Control Clinical Research Bureau invited Cole to serve on an advisory committee. He is credited with providing information about the potential positive eugenic effects of birth control.

Bird banding
Beyond his accomplishments in genetics, Cole had a special interest in birds. He first proposed banding birds to study migration with a paper in 1902, "Suggestions for a Method of Studying the Migration of Birds." He tried a small-scale experiment in 1902, applying tags to fish, but the work was discontinued. In the winter of 1907–1908, a small number of birds were banded by Cole and members of the New Haven Bird Club.  Shortly thereafter, at a meeting of the American Ornithologists' Union, the American Bird Banding Association was established, with Cole as president.  In the period 1902–1922, Cole wrote seven papers on bird banding.  For these efforts, he is regarded as the father of American bird banding; however, his relocation to Wisconsin in 1910 curtailed his ability to pursue banding in the field.

Expeditions
In 1899, Cole joined E. H. Harriman and a number of scientists and artists on the famous Harriman Alaska Expedition.  On that expedition, he cultivated the friendship of bird artist Louis Agassiz Fuertes; much later, Fuertes made a painting of two of Cole's experimental ring doves, but apparently did not publish it.

In 1904 he joined an expedition to Yucatán, and collected and identified 128 species and subspecies of birds, reporting his work in the Bulletin of the Museum of Comparative Zoology. In the period 1901–1906, he also did field work in Bermuda, the Dry Tortugas, and at Woods Hole.

Later life and death
Cole retired from his post as department chair in 1939.  He died in Madison, Wisconsin on February 17, 1948.

Legacy and recognition

Cole received an honorary doctorate from Michigan State College in 1945.

Selected publications

References

American geneticists
American ornithologists
1877 births
1948 deaths
University of Michigan alumni
Harvard University alumni
Michigan State University alumni
People from Allegany, New York
Scientists from New York (state)